Athineos is a Greek surname. Notable people with the surname include: 

George Athineos (1923–2002), Greek-American football player
Nikos Athineos, Greek conductor, composer and pianist

Greek-language surnames